Rüster or Ruster is a surname. Notable people with the surname include:

 Hugo Rüster (1872-??), German Olympic rower
 Mona Rüster, German table tennis player
 Otto Rüster (1895–??), German chess master
 Sébastien Ruster (born 1982), French professional football player
 Ruster (footballer) (born 1996), Brazilian professional football player